James "Jim" D. Proctor (born December 27, 1957) is an American geographer, the editor and author of numerous books and articles, and professor of environmental studies at Lewis and Clark College in Portland, Oregon (2005–). Before coming to Lewis and Clark College, he taught in the department of geography at the University of California, Santa Barbara (1992–2005). In 2002, Proctor founded the Alder Creek Community Forest educational nonprofit in his birthplace of Canyonville, Oregon. Proctor is also a senior fellow at the Breakthrough Institute.

Career
Proctor's scholarship in environmental theory has gone through three main phases. Following his PhD thesis on the ethics and ideology of the Pacific Northwest spotted owl debate, Proctor primarily published on concepts of nature in contemporary American environmentalism. He next explored science and religion, again in the context of human/biophysical nature and recent environmental movements. Most recently, Proctor has published in conjunction with his work in environmental studies, including theory, pedagogy, and their interweaving in environmental engagement across ideological difference.

Proctor is known as a critic of many key concepts that inform contemporary American environmentalism, including nature, sustainability, and even environment—"...at least in the sense that environment is generally understood today." His approach could be called "post-naturalism," especially as articulated via the longtime influence of Bruno Latour, in works such as Politics of Nature and We Have Never Been Modern. As with Latour, Proctor's post-naturalism is less a rejection of environmental concern than a repudiation of certain binary assumptions it has inherited from modernity, as well as common holistic solutions. Proctor's publications replace these options with "counting between one and two", involving more dynamic, relational approaches to nature and environment.

More recently, Proctor has published on environmental engagement, building in part on his biography as an urban Oregonian with longstanding roots in rural Oregon, and responding to U.S. political trends suggesting increasing polarization. Proctor has argued for engagement as a third way beyond simple agreement or disagreement among people who differ on issues of environment, one marked by "creative tension," an embrace of paradox as deep environmental truths come into productive conflict with each other

Proctor launched EcoTypes, an educational and research initiative, in 2017. EcoTypes is a free, anonymous online survey with associated resources designed for participants to explore a broad range of environmental ideas known as axes (18 total), which have yielded three statistically-derived underlying patterns called themes, and five theme-based frameworks or EcoTypes, with names such as Small is Beautiful and Indigenous Justice. As of spring 2022, the EcoTypes survey has been completed nearly 8000 times, with cross-national collaboration and a larger scholarly project on environmental frameworks underway.

References 

Living people
American geographers
Lewis & Clark College faculty
University of California, Santa Barbara faculty
People from Douglas County, Oregon
1957 births